

1960

1961

1962

1963

1964

1965

1966

1967

1968

1969

1960–1969 statistical leaders

See also
 University of Arkansas
 Arkansas Razorbacks
 Arkansas Razorbacks football, 1950–59
 Arkansas Razorbacks football, 1970–79
 Cotton Bowl Classic
 Sugar Bowl
 Southwest Conference

Notes
Arkansas Razorbacks Sports Network Online 1960–1969 Football Schedule/Results

1960s in Arkansas